Grenada is an island country located between the Caribbean Sea and Atlantic Ocean, north of Trinidad and Tobago. There are no large inland bodies of water on the island, which consists entirely of the state of Grenada. The coastline is 121 km long. The island has 15 constituencies and speaks English and Grenadian Creole. It is volcanic in origin and its topography is mountainous.

Natural resources include timber, tropical fruit and deepwater harbours.

Grenada and its largely uninhabited outlying territories are the most southerly of the Windward Islands. The Grenadine Islands chain consists of some 600 islets; those south of the Martinique Channel belong to Grenada, while those north of the channel are part of the nation of St. Vincent and the Grenadines. Located about 160 kilometers north of Venezuela, at approximately 12° north latitude and 61° west longitude, Grenada and its territories occupy a small area of 433 square kilometers. Grenada, known as the Spice Isle because of its production of nutmeg and mace, is the largest at 310 square kilometers, or about the size of the city of Detroit. The island is oval shaped and framed by a jagged southern coastline; its maximum width is thirty-four kilometers, and its maximum length is nineteen kilometers. St. George's, the capital and the nation's most important harbour, is favorably situated near a lagoon on the southwestern coast. Of all the islands belonging to Grenada, only two are of consequence: Carriacou, with a population of a few thousand, and its neighbour Petit Martinique, roughly 40 kilometers northeast of Grenada and populated by some 700 inhabitants.

Terrain 

Part of the volcanic chain in the Lesser Antilles arc, Grenada and its possessions generally vary in elevation from under 300 meters to over 600 meters above sea level. Grenada is more rugged and densely foliated than its outlying possessions, but other geographical conditions are more similar. Grenada's landmass rises from a narrow, coastal plain in a generally north–south trending axis of ridges and narrow valleys. Mount St. Catherine is the highest peak at 840 meters.

Although many of the rocks and soils are of volcanic origin, the volcanic cones dotting Grenada are long dormant. The only known active volcano in the area is Kick 'em Jenny, just north between Grenada and Carriacou. Some of the drainage features on Grenada remain from its volcanic past. There are a few crater lakes, the largest of which is Grand Etang. The swift upper reaches of rivers, which occasionally overflow and cause flooding and landslides, generally cut deeply into the conic slopes. By contrast, many of the water courses in the lowlands tend to be sluggish and meandering.

Table of Islands

Climate  
 
The Grenadian climate is tropical, tempered by northeast trade winds.
 
The abundance of water is primarily caused by the tropical, wet climate. The greatest monthly totals are recorded throughout Grenada from June through November, the months when tropical storms and hurricanes are most likely to occur. Rainfall is less pronounced from December through May, when the equatorial low-pressure system moves south. Similarly, the highest humidities, usually close to 80 percent, are recorded during the rainy months, and values from 68 to 78 percent are registered during the drier period. Temperatures averaging  are constant throughout the year, however, with slightly higher readings in the lowlands.

Statistics 

 Area
 Total: 348.5 km²
 Land: 344 km²
 Maritime claims
 Territorial sea: 
 Exclusive economic zone:  and 
 Land use
 Arable land: 8.82%
 Permanent crops: 20.59%
 Other: 70.59% (2012 est.)
 Irrigated land
 2.19 km² (2003)
 Natural hazards
 Lies on edge of hurricane belt; hurricane season lasts from June to November
 Extreme points
 Northernmost point – Gun Point, Carriacou
 Northernmost point (Grenada only) - Tanga Langue, Saint Patrick Parish
 Easternmost point – east coast of Petite Martinique island
 Easternmost point (Grenada only) - Artiste Point, Saint Andrew Parish
 Southernmost point – Glover Island, Saint George Parish
 Southernmost point (Grenada only) - Prickly Point, Saint George Parish
 Westernmost point – Point Salines, Saint George Parish
 Highest point – Mount Saint Catherine: 840 m
 Lowest point – Caribbean Sea: 0 m

 Environment - international agreements
 Party to: Biodiversity, Climate Change, Desertification, Endangered Species, Law of the Sea, Ozone Layer Protection, Whaling
 Geography - note
 The administration of the islands of the Grenadines group is divided between Saint Vincent and the Grenadines (northern Grenadines) and Grenada (southern Grenadines)

See also

 Grenadines
 List of cities in Grenada
 List of islands of Grenada
 List of rivers of Grenada
 List of volcanoes in Grenada
 Parishes of Grenada

Notes

References

External links

 

 
Grenada geography-related lists
Islands
Subdivisions of Grenada